Alvand "Alvin" Salehi is an American tech entrepreneur, attorney and angel investor. He is the co-founder of Shef, Code.gov and a former White House technology advisor under President Obama.

Early life and education 
Salehi was born and raised in Orange County, California. He graduated from the University of Southern California with a Juris Doctor, a master's degree in management, a bachelor's degree in political science, and a bachelor's degree in journalism.

Career

Shef 
In 2019, Salehi launched a venture aimed toward creating meaningful economic opportunities for immigrants and refugees by enabling them to cook and sell food from home. Since launch, Shef has served millions of meals across the United States and helped immigrants and refugees support their families by selling homemade food to their communities. Following COVID-19's impact on the restaurant industry, Shef expanded its mission to include feeding frontline healthcare workers and putting restaurant cooks back to work. As of March 2023, the company has raised more than $100 million in funding from influential investors including Andreessen Horowitz, Jeff Jordan, Padma Lakshmi, Tiffany Haddish, Katy Perry, Orlando Bloom, Tony Robbins, Andre Iguodala, Odell Beckham Jr., and Russell Westbrook.

The White House 
Salehi joined the White House in 2015 as a technology advisor in the Office of the US CIO. Under the Obama Administration, he led the development of the nation's first-ever Federal Source Code Policy, which was officially published on August 8, 2016. The policy cuts wasteful taxpayer spending on software acquisitions by mandating that government-funded software be shared across all federal agencies. It also requires that a portion of government code be released to the public as open source software to maximize the economic benefits associated with code sharing and reuse. The draft of the Federal Source Code Policy was recorded as one of the most highly commented White House policies in history.

On November 3, 2016, Salehi launched Code.gov with US CIO Tony Scott. Since then, Code.gov has become the nation's primary platform for sharing and improving government code, boasting a large collection of reusable software projects from dozens of federal agencies and organizations. Notable examples include a reusable Facebook Messenger bot built by the Executive Office of the President, a comprehensive web analytics tool built by GSA, and an intuitive tracking application built by the Pentagon for a NATO mission in Afghanistan—all of which Salehi has discussed in keynote presentations around the country.

Harvard Law School 
On July 13, 2017, Salehi was appointed by Harvard University to serve as a research affiliate at the law school's Berkman Klein Center for Internet & Society. His research focuses on the impact of open source software on code security, economic efficiency, and technological innovation.

Previous Work 
Prior to joining the White House, Salehi helped "lead the State Department’s efforts to expand Internet access to Africa and improve global market access for US technology companies. He also served at the Advanced Research Projects Agency, which invests in transformative, cutting-edge technologies on behalf of the federal government."

Recognition

Forbes 30 Under 30 
In November 2017, Salehi was named to Forbes 30 Under 30. Forbes recognized Salehi for his tech policy work for the architecture of the Federal Source Code Policy and launching the US government's Code.gov platform.

World's 100 Most Influential 
In November 2018, Salehi was included in Apolitical's list of the World's 100 Most Influential Young People in Government. He was listed in the top 20 alongside Congresswoman Alexandria Ocasio-Cortez.

Refugee Work 
In April 2018, Salehi was appointed as a Millennium Fellow at the Atlantic Council. Since joining, he has met with Syrian refugees and political leaders in Turkey and Greece to discuss pathways toward resolving the refugee crisis in Europe and the Middle East. Additionally, he has taken an active role in determining how technology can be used most effectively to resolve humanitarian crises, calling for increased cross-country collaboration and global crowdsourcing as a means to identifying solutions quickly. In July 2018, Salehi spoke at the NATO Summit in Brussels, stating that “sharing and collaboration is the key to remaining competitive in the digital age.”

Trivia

White House Fence Jumper 
On May 2, 2016, Salehi was featured in the Washington Post for stopping a robbery near the White House. According to the article, Salehi was en route to a meeting when he saw a man wrestle a woman to the ground and steal her purse. Salehi charged at the man, forcing him to retreat and run toward the fence surrounding the White House. The man scaled the fence and jumped into the complex. As Secret Service officers made their arrest, Salehi retrieved the purse and handed it back to the woman.

References 

American technology executives
American lawyers
Living people
Open source people
Open source advocates
American civil servants
Year of birth missing (living people)